Jonathan Vallée (born April 22, 1995) is a Canadian former soccer player.

Playing career
Vallée played youth soccer with the Montreal Impact Academy.

In March 2015, he joined USL club FC Montreal, the second team of the Montreal Impact, on a professional contract. In July 2015, he was released by the club. 

After being released by FC Montreal, Vallée joined the Ottawa Fury FC Academy in the Première ligue de soccer du Québec. In October 2015, he signed with the Ottawa Fury FC first team in the North American Soccer League.

From 2016 to 2018, he played with FC Gatineau in the Première Ligue de soccer du Québec.

In 2018, he began attending Laval University, where he played for the men's soccer team, until 2021. In 2018 and 2019, he was named an RSEQ Second Team All-Star in indoor soccer and in 2019, he was a Second Team All-Star in outdoor soccer.

In 2018, he played in the Canadian Futsal Championship with Sporting Montréal FC.

References

External links

1995 births
Living people
Canadian soccer players
Association football midfielders
Soccer people from Quebec
Sportspeople from Gatineau
Montreal Impact U23 players
FC Montreal players
Ottawa Fury FC players
Canadian Soccer League (1998–present) players
USL Championship players
Première ligue de soccer du Québec players
FC Gatineau players